HMS Pomona was a 28-gun Enterprise-class sixth-rate frigate of the Royal Navy. Pomona was first commissioned in September 1778 under the command of Captain William Waldegrave.

As a result of the battle the British ships captured two Spanish prizes with a cargo of bullion worth in excess of $3,000,000. Pomona and Lowestoffe also shared in the prize money for the St. Domingo and her cargo, which included 124 serons (crates) of indigo.

Then on 15 June 1780, Pomona,  and Lowestoffe captured the brig Delaware, William Collins, Master. She was of 120 tons, armed with guns and had a crew of 53 men. She was sailing from Philadelphia to Port au Prince, with a cargo of flour and fish. More importantly, they also captured the French navy cutter Sans Pareil, of 16 guns and 100 men, as she was sailing from Martinique to Cap-Français. She was the former British privateer Non Such.

In 1795 Pomona was renamed Amphitrite after the previous  was wrecked after striking an uncharted submerged rock whilst entering Leghorn harbour on 30 January 1794.

Fate
She was taken to pieces at Portsmouth August 1811.

Citations

References
 
 Robert Gardiner, The First Frigates, Conway Maritime Press, London 1992. .

 David Lyon, The Sailing Navy List, Conway Maritime Press, London 1993. .
 

1778 ships
Sixth-rate frigates of the Royal Navy